James Ricardo is an American film director, screenwriter and producer.

Filmography

References

External links
 
 
 

American film directors
American male screenwriters
American film producers
American agnostics
English-language film directors
Living people
Year of birth missing (living people)